I Want You is the only album from freestyle music singer Shana, released in 1989 by Vision Records. Three singles were released from the album, "I Want You", which reached No. 40 on the Billboard Hot 100 chart in the United States, "You Can't Get Away", which reached No. 82, and "Falling Slowly", which failed to chart.

Track listing

Charts

References

1989 debut albums
Shana (singer) albums